The national park of Djurdjura is one of the national parks of Algeria. It is located in Kabylie and is named after the Djurdjura Range of the Tell Atlas.

Description
Nearby cities include Tizi Ouzou to the north and Bouïra to the south. The park is home to a very broken tectonics, as well as many forests, grottoes, gorges, and  important fauna, including the endangered Barbary macaque, Macaca sylvanus, a primate whose prehistoric distribution in North Africa was much broader than today.

Name 
The name of the mountain chain comes from the Kabyle word Jjerjer which means "great cold" or "elevation", from the old compound word Jer n Jer "the mountain of the mountains".
The Roman Empire used to call it Iron mountain in Latin (Mons Ferratus), in reference to the soil of the region, as well as to the resistance of the Kabyles against the Roman annexation of Kabylie. The name Djurdjura is also used for the villages located in this mountain chain. Mmis n'Djerdjer means "children of the Djurdjura", which is a Kabyle word referring to mountain inhabitants, there is also a Kabyle female group called DjurDjura.

References

External links 
  Algerian Ministry of Forestry - National park of Djurdjura
 Park data on UNEP-WPMC

National parks of Algeria
Protected areas of Algeria
Protected areas established in 1983
Geography of Bouïra Province
Tourist attractions in Bouïra Province
1983 establishments in Algeria